Breaffy GAA is a Gaelic Athletic Association club based in Breaffy in County Mayo, Ireland.

The club was founded in 1953.

Notable players
Seamus O'Shea

Aidan O'Shea

Rob Hennelly

Matthew Ruane
Conor O'Shea

Notable managers
Peter Ford

References

Gaelic football clubs in County Mayo